Holtzheim is a commune in the Bas-Rhin department in Grand Est in north-eastern France. The village is surrounded by farmland and thereby separated from the Strasbourg conurbation:  however, Strasbourg airport is less than two kilometres away to the south. The little river Bruche runs through the heart of the Holtzheim.

See also
 Communes of the Bas-Rhin department

References

Communes of Bas-Rhin
Bas-Rhin communes articles needing translation from French Wikipedia